Roscoe's House of Chicken 'N Waffles is an American soul food restaurant chain that operates seven locations in the Los Angeles metropolitan area. It was founded by Herb Hudson in 1975.
The Los Angeles Times has referred to Roscoe's as "such an L.A. institution that people don't even question the strange combo anymore." The New York Times refers to it as a "beloved soul food chain." The original location in Hollywood remains open.

Trademark infringements
In 2008, Roscoe's filed a successful trademark infringement lawsuit against a "Rosscoe's House of Chicken & Waffles" that had opened in Chicago.  The infringing store was forced to drop its infringing logo and name.  A previous "Rosscoe's" had opened in New York City, but the LA-based chain opted to not sue that location because it had no plans to enter the New York market; however, Roscoe's did plan to enter the Chicago market.

In popular culture
The chain has been featured several times in popular media.  

The 1988 movie Tapeheads features a fake ad spot for the company. It was also mentioned in Quentin Tarantino's Jackie Brown, the comedy film Rush Hour and Swingers. In the 2005 film, Be Cool, Roscoe's is referenced in a conversation between Vince Vaughn's character and that of Dwayne Johnson. The restaurant is also in season 1 episode 5 of Netflix's #blackAF.

Ludacris mentioned the restaurant in the song "Call Up The Homies" from the album Theater of the Mind with the lyrics "Let's roll to Roscoe's and grab somethin' to eat", while Californian band The Aquabats also mentioned Roscoe's alongside several other chicken restaurants in their 1997 song "Magic Chicken!". 

The restaurant is mentioned by Will Smith in an episode of The Fresh Prince of Bel-Air, in which he states that he believes heaven is a combination of a Roscoe's restaurant and Sir Mix-a-Lot music video. Snoop Dogg considers the restaurant one of his favorites: on his reality show, Snoop Dogg's Father Hood, he took David Beckham in 2007, and in 2008 he took Larry King on Larry King Live.

The Adult Swim animated series Black Dynamite had a running gag in which "Roscoe" (Jimmie Walker Jr.) hasn't yet hit on the winning combination of fried chicken and waffles. Instead, he combines it with services like "Chicken and Car Stereo Installation" or "Chicken and Income Tax Preparation". In the movie ‘’Black Dynamite’’, which has a different timeline than the series, Cream Corn (Tommy Davidson) tries to order sausage and waffles in a restaurant. When told by the waitress that he can only have a waffle and "the chicken from last night" incredulously shouts "Chicken and waffles?" at which point, in the background, Roscoe finally figures out the winning combination, exclaiming "That's it!".

Notable incidents
In 2011, President Barack Obama visited Roscoe's while on a campaign trail in Los Angeles. 

On September 12, 2022, rapper PnB Rock was shot and killed at a Roscoe's in Los Angeles during a robbery.

See also
 List of soul food restaurants

References

External links

Restaurants established in 1975
Fast-food chains of the United States
Poultry restaurants
Restaurants in Los Angeles
Regional restaurant chains in the United States
Soul food restaurants in the United States
1975 establishments in California